The Pied Piper is a 1933 American Pre-Code animated short film based on the story of the Pied Piper of Hamelin. The short was produced by Walt Disney Productions, directed by Wilfred Jackson, and released on September 16, 1933, as a part of the Silly Symphonies series.

Plot
In the city of Hamelin, there is a large population of rats that keeps growing and eating all the food in sight. The mayor offers to pay a bag of gold to whoever can get rid of the rats. At that moment, the Pied Piper shows up and offers his services. By playing a tune on his pipe, he hypnotizes the rodents to follow him out of Hamelin. Then he creates a wheel of cheese with his pipe, tempting the mice to go in and eat it, and once all of the mice were in the holes of the cheese, he makes it vanish.

When he returns to the town, the mayor refuses to pay him the bag of gold because he just played a pipe, and gives him one coin, while the other adults laugh at him. Furious, the Pied Piper decides to get revenge and save the children from growing up to be like the adults by taking them away.

The mayor and adults dismiss him, since they locked the town gate after the rats left and no one can get out. However, the Piper not only charms the children into following him but enchants the town gate into ripping itself open and allowing the children to leave, and the Mayor is left in horror to face the wrath of the adults for the loss of their children. The Piper leads the children to the mountains and an enchanted land with fun and games, where they all live happily ever after.

Home media
The short was released on December 19, 2006, on Walt Disney Treasures: More Silly Symphonies, Volume Two.

Additional releases include:
 Walt Disney Cartoon Classics Limited Gold Edition II: The Disney Dream Factory: 1933-1938 (VHS) 1985
 Walt Disney's Timeless Tales Volume 1: The Prince and the Pauper/Three Little Pigs/The Tortoise and the Hare (DVD) 2005
 Walt Disney Animation Collection: Classic Short Films Volume 3: The Prince and the Pauper (DVD) 2009

References

External links 
 
 

1933 short films
1930s color films
American children's animated films
Films based on folklore
Films directed by Wilfred Jackson
Films produced by Walt Disney
Films set in the Holy Roman Empire
Silly Symphonies
1930s Disney animated short films
1933 animated films
1933 films
Films based on Pied Piper of Hamelin
Films scored by Leigh Harline